Irvine Football Club was a football club from the town of Irvine, Ayrshire, Scotland.

History

The club was formed in 1875, and played its first match on the Burgh Moor against Portland of Kilmarnock, losing 2–0 after conceding two late goals to the more experienced club.

The club was one of the entrants to the first Ayrshire Cup in 1877–78, being thrown out of the competition on a technicality.  

Irvine entered the Scottish Cup on three occasions, scratching in 1879–80 and 1881–82.  In 1880–81 the club played its only Cup match, at Beith F.C., losing 4–1 after failing to take advantage of the strong wind behind its players in the first half.  The club was due to host Hurlford F.C. in the first round in 1881–82, but, on the basis that the players had not had any practice, the club agreed to cede the tie.

The club's final competitive match was a 4–0 Ayrshire Cup defeat at Stewarton Cunninghame F.C. in October 1881, and the final actual recorded match a 3–1 defeat at home to the obscure Ayr Western.  A concert was given to raise funds for the club on 30 December 1881, although an advert for it appeared on the following day.  There are no recorded matches afterwards.

Colours

The club's colours were navy blue shirts and white shorts.

Grounds

The club originally played on the Burgh Moor, moving to a pitch on the Irvine Mains farm by 1878.  By 1879 the club was playing at the Newfield ground on the Kilwinning Road, later the home of the Irvine Academicals.

External links

Ayrshire Cup results

References

Football clubs in Scotland
Defunct football clubs in Scotland
Association football clubs established in 1875
Association football clubs disestablished in 1881
1875 establishments in Scotland
1881 disestablishments in Scotland